Virgin Forest is a 1985 Filipino period film directed by Peque Gallaga. A self-described B-movie, it stars Sarsi Emmanuel, who plays a barrio lass of Chinese ancestry; Miguel Rodriguez, as a Filipino-Spanish illustrado; and, Abel Jurado, who plays the lover of Sarsi's character.

Plot
The film is set in the 1900s during the First Philippine Republic. Macabebe soldiers are trying to capture Emilio Aguinaldo. Alfonisto (Miguel Rodriguez) and Chayong (Sarsi Emmanuel) are caught up in this pursuit and in a love triangle. In the end, Aguinaldo is captured and the Macabebe soldiers are killed.

Cast
Sarsi Emmanuel as Chayong
Miguel Rodriguez as Alfonsito
Abel Jurado as Alipio
Jude Arboleda as Fonseca
Arbie Antonio as Lt. Dalmacio
Turko Cervantes and Pen Medina as leaders of the Macabebes 
Peque Gallaga as Kamaggay

References

External links

1985 films
Films directed by Peque Gallaga
Films set in 1901
Philippine drama films
Films set during the Philippine–American War
Tagalog-language films